Apple Grove may refer to:
An orchard
Apple Grove, Kentucky
Apple Grove, Ohio
Apple Grove, Mason County, West Virginia
Apple Grove, McDowell County, West Virginia